Iskan is a village in Zaoksky District of Tula Oblast, Russia.
 Latitude: 54 ° 47'60″ North Latitude
 Longitude: 37 ° 17'60″ East Longitude
 Height above sea level: 180 m

References

Rural localities in Tula Oblast